Chiharu Matsuyama (松山千春, born December 16, 1955) is a Japanese folk singer and songwriter.

He made his debut with the single Tabidachi in 1977, and success soon followed with the two hits Toki no Itazura and Kisetsu no Nakade.

Matsuyama has been portrayed in film by Shunsuke Daitō. Daitō played him in a 2008 film based on Matsuyama's autobiographical work Ashoro Yori, published in 1979.

References

External links
Matsuyama Chiharu at Columbia Music Japan

1955 births
Japanese male singer-songwriters
Living people
Japanese folk singers
Musicians from Hokkaido
20th-century Japanese male singers
20th-century Japanese singers